Trevor Halford is a Canadian politician, who was elected to the Legislative Assembly of British Columbia in the 2020 British Columbia general election. Spouse Holly Halford He represents the electoral district of Surrey-White Rock as a member of the British Columbia Liberal Party.

Electoral record

References

21st-century Canadian politicians
British Columbia Liberal Party MLAs
People from Surrey, British Columbia
Living people
Year of birth missing (living people)